The subjective character of experience is a term in psychology and the philosophy of mind denoting that all subjective phenomena are associated with a single point of view ("ego"). The term was coined and illuminated by Thomas Nagel in his famous paper "What Is it Like to Be a Bat?"

Nagel argues that, because bats are apparently conscious mammals with a way of perceiving their environment entirely different from that of human beings, it is impossible to speak of "what is it like to be a bat for the bat" or, while the example of the bat is particularly illustrative, any conscious species, as each organism has a unique point of view from which no other organism can gather experience. To Nagel, the subjective character of experience implies the cognitive closure of the human mind to some facts, specifically the mental states that physical states create.

Subjective reality

Subjective character of experience implies that the perception of all things, concepts, and "truths" in the universe differs between individuals: we all live in different worlds, each of which may have things in common, because of our unique perspectives on our worlds. The only thing to which one can hold oneself is something one has experienced or perceived. Until someone has had an experience of something the object or concept within itself is not "real." Someone in Africa is aware of the existence of fire and sees it but for an Inuit who has never seen fire before the fire does not exist in the same way. The idea of the subjectivity of one's "reality" also hints at an aspect of moral relativism, that each person's opinions are the only things they can hold themselves to.

See also
 Dualism (philosophy of mind)
 Functionalism
 Hallucinations in the sane
 Inverted spectrum
 Mary's Room
 Multiverse
 Philosophical zombies
 Philosophy of mind
 Philosophy of perception
 Physicalism
 Pragmatism
 Qualia
 Synesthesia
 The map is not the territory
 Vertiginous question

References

Song, D. Subjective Universe: Interweaving Matter and Mind through Cyclical Time. 2020

Consciousness studies
Subjective experience